Guy Melven Mitchell (January 3, 1923 – June 26, 1972) was an American professional basketball player. He played for the Denver Nuggets in the National Basketball League during the 1948–49 season and averaged 3.0 points per game.

References

1923 births
1972 deaths
United States Army personnel of World War II
American men's basketball players
Basketball players from Kansas
Denver Nuggets (1948–1950) players
Forwards (basketball)
Guards (basketball)
Pittsburg State Gorillas men's basketball players
Basketball players from Denver